The 1946 Chicago Cardinals season was the 27th season the team was in the league. The team improved on their previous output of 1–9, winning six games. They failed to qualify for the playoffs for the 21st consecutive season.

Schedule

Standings

References

1946
Chicago Cardinals
Chicago Card